Sud Kaen Saen Rak (lit: "most hate, most love") is Thai TV series aired on Channel 3 from April 18, 2015, to May 29, 2015, on Fridays, Saturdays, and Sundays at 08:15 pm.

It reruns every day starting April 21, 2022 from 08:50 am to 10:25 am on weekdays and 9:15 am to 10:25 am on Saturday and Sunday.

Plot 

It tells the story of two families. Hatred and love closely intertwined the lives of two families.

Cast

Main 
Parental generation
Ratklao Amaradit as Yaem
Manatsanun Phanlerdwongsakul as Ampohn
Pornchita na Songkhla as Urai

Second-generation
Kanin Chobpradit as Yongyuth
Jakkarin Phooriphad as Yongyuth (youth)
Sirin Preediyanon as Hatairat
Nita Kannaket as Hatairat (youth)
Amolrada Chaiyadej as Rapeephan
Sarunchana Apisamaimongkol as Rapeephan (youth)
Nattawin Wattanagitiphat as Thana
Vichayut Limratanamongkol as Thana (youth)

Supporting 
Parental generation
Chintara Sukapatana as Am
Kullanat Preeyawat as Phayom
Patiparn Pataweekarn as Tawee
Vorarit Fuangarome as Luerpong
Patchata Nampan as Prayong
Rhatha Phongam as Suda
Pisanu Nimsakul as Prayoon
Sudhipong Vatanajang as Ko Ta
Praimaa Ratchata as Noklek
Vasidtee Srilofung as Samli
Tana Sinprasat as Nak
Second-generation
Artit Tangwiboonpanit as Luerchai
Raweeroj Rattanatrakulchai as Luerchai (youth)
Sattaphong Phiangphor as Pavarit
Pisitpong Changlor as Pavarit (youth)
Panpaporn Sridurongkatham as Mayuri
 Pornsroung Rouyruen as Mayuri (youth)
Chutimon Sakulthai as Lada
Krongkwan Mongkol as Lada (youth)
Techin Pinchatree as Wasan
Kanyarat Sunthronnan as Aoi
Jeerawat Yotsuphannaporn as Jeera

Cameoes 
Nukkid Boonthong as Pratuang
Athiwad Sanidwong na Ayudhya as Khan
Krailad Kriangkrai as Headman Boonsong
Pimkae Goonchorn na Ayudhya as Yoi

Production & reception 
The series based on a novel in same title by Chulamanee, Nakhon Sawan novelist. It was his second work adapted into a television series, following Ching Chang in 2009 on Channel 5.

Filming lasted 16 months, starting in January 2014. Before the broadcast, Sud Kaen Saen Rak was thought to be just an outsider series.

It tells the story of three generations of intertwining lives and the family grudges that befall them. Loaded with melodrama, and the over-the-top physical and verbal fights between female characters that became the show's iconic scenes, it unexpectedly became extremely popular among Thai viewers and became the talk of the town in 2015.

The series was highly acclaimed. Especially the protagonist "Yaem" played by the veteran singer and actress Rutklao Amaradit, Yaem is an old woman with a very insidious and shrewish. She is the one who plots the life of her eldest son and grandson to hate their wife and mother.

Awards & nominations

Sequel 
The sequel Krong Kam aired in 2019 on the same channel.

International broadcast 
It was broadcast on Cambodia's PNN TV in 2016.

References

External links 
 

2015 Thai television series debuts
2015 Thai television series endings
Channel 3 (Thailand) original programming
Television series set in the 1970s
Television series set in the 1980s
Television series set in the 1990s
Television series set in the 2010s
Thai drama television series